The Mukim Batu is an administrative division (Mukim) located in the Federal Territory of Kuala Lumpur and Selangor. The administrative division was created on 1973, one year before Kuala Lumpur was declared a Federal Territory.

References

1973 establishments in Malaysia
Batu